Eugene Stewart Woodburn (August 20, 1886 – January 18, 1961) was a professional baseball pitcher. He played two seasons in Major League Baseball for the St. Louis Cardinals (1911–12).

External links

Major League Baseball pitchers
St. Louis Cardinals players
Kalamazoo White Sox players
Dallas Giants players
Louisville Colonels (minor league) players
Sioux City Indians players
Waterbury Nattatucks players
Baseball players from Ohio
1886 births
1961 deaths
People from Bellaire, Ohio